Awaken to the Suffering is the fourth studio album by the death metal band Pathology from San Diego. It was released by Victory on September 13, 2011.

It is the first album by the band to feature Jonathan Huber who was formerly the vocalist of the Washington-based deathcore band I Declare War. After recording one more album following this one, Huber left the band in December 2012.

Track listing

Personnel
Pathology
Jonathan Huber – vocals
Tim Tiszczenko – guitar
Kevin Schwartz – guitar
Oscar Ramirez – bass
Dave Astor – drums

Production
Producer – Daniel Castleman
Mastering – Alan Douches
Artwork – Par Olofsson

References

2011 albums
Pathology (band) albums
Albums with cover art by Pär Olofsson